Bartlomiej Lipinski (born 16 November 1996) is a Polish volleyball player. At the professional club level, he plays for Indykpol AZS Olsztyn.

He was called up to his national team for the 2022 Nations League.

Honours

Universiade
 2019  Summer Universiade

References

External links

 
 Player profile at LegaVolley.it 
 Player profile at PlusLiga.pl 
 Player profile at Volleybox.net

1996 births
Living people
People from Maków County
Sportspeople from Masovian Voivodeship
Polish men's volleyball players
Universiade medalists in volleyball
Universiade silver medalists for Poland
Medalists at the 2019 Summer Universiade
Polish expatriate sportspeople in Italy
Expatriate volleyball players in Italy
Polish expatriate sportspeople in Qatar
Expatriate volleyball players in Qatar
AZS Częstochowa players
BBTS Bielsko-Biała players
BKS Visła Bydgoszcz players
Cuprum Lubin players
Trefl Gdańsk players
Outside hitters